The Hanuman River  or Khwae Hanuman originates in South San Kamphaeng Mountain Range, the Khao Yai National park. It begins at the confluence of many small tributaries at Samphanta Subdistrict, Na Di District, Prachin Buri Province. It flows southward and  joins the Phra Prong River to become the Bang Pakong River in Kabin Buri district, Prachinburi Province.

Hanuman